Congtai District is a district of the city of Handan, Hebei, People's Republic of China, with a population of 330,000 residing in an area of just .

The district seats the Handan's executive, legislature and judiciary, together with its CPC and Public Security bureaus.

Administration
As of 2009, the district comprises 10 street committees and 1 township.  There are a total of 70 block committees under these Subdistricts:

Subdistricts
Renmin Road Subdistrict
Zhonghua Subdistrict
East Congtai Subdistrict
West Congtai Subdistrict
Guangmingqiao Subdistrict
Qinhe Subdistrict
Heping Subdistrict
Liulinqiao Subdistrict
East Lianfang Subdistrict
West Lianfang Subdistrict

Township
Sucao Township

References 

County-level divisions of Hebei
Handan